Gianni A. Sarcone (born March 20, 1962) is a visual artist and author who collaborates with educational publications, writing articles and columns on topics related to art, science, and mathematics education. He has contributed to several science magazines, including Focus Junior (Italy), Query-CICAP (Italy), Rivista Magia (Italy), Alice & Bob / Bocconi University (Italy), Brain Games (USA), and Tangente (France). Sarcone has over 30 years of experience as a designer and researcher in the areas of visual creativity, recreational mathematics and educational games.

Visual research 

Considered a leading authority on visual perception by academic institutions, Sarcone was invited to serve as a juror at the Third Annual "Best Illusion of the Year Contest" held in Sarasota, Florida (USA). His optical illusion projects 'Mask of Love' and 'Autokinetic Illusion' were named among the top 10 best optical illusions in the 2011 and 2014 "Best Illusion of the Year Contests", respectively. In 2017, he placed third in the contest for his ‘Dynamic Müller-Lyer Illusion’.

Amongst other notable projects, he created and designed an “hypnoptical” visual illusion that was used in the logo and institutional signage of the 2014 Grec Festival of Barcelona, a significant cultural event featuring avant-garde musical, dance, and theater performances.

On October 16th, 2021, for the International Observe the Moon Night, his joint work “Moona Lisa” has been selected as Astronomy Picture of the Day (APOD) by the NASA.

Honors and awards

Educational project 
G. Sarcone has authored and published numerous educational textbooks and illustrated books in English, French and Italian on brain training and the mechanism of vision. He is the founder of Archimedes-lab.org a consulting network of experts specializing in improving and enhancing creativity - for which he has been commended with a long list of accolades and awards, including the 2003 Scientific American Sci/Tech Web Award in Mathematics and received recognition in the US from: CNN Headline News, National Council of Teachers of Mathematics (NCTM), and NewScientist.com.

Media and broadcasting 
Some of Sarcone’s artworks such as The Other Face of Paris or Flashing Star have gone viral on the Internet.
His works were also presented in several national and international television programs, including 'Rai 3' Italy, 'RTL 9 Channel' France, 'TSR 1 Channel' Switzerland, and in the following TV series:
 ‘Nippon Television Network’ / NTV (Japan): "Fukashigi"; Japanese: 不可思議探偵団 (2012).
 ‘National Geographic Television’ (US): "Brain Games Science" (2014).
 ‘Beyond Production’ PTY LTD (Australia): "Wild But True" – Season 1 (2014).
 "Masahiro Nakai’s Useful Library" show, a widely followed Japanese TV program (June, 2015).

Selected works

Bibliography

Recent published works (2014-20) 
G. Sarcone is the author (and co-author) of the following books:
Fantastic Optical Illusions: More Than 150 Deceptive Images and Visual Tricks, Carlton, UK, 2020, .
Ultimate Eye Twisters, Carlton, UK, 2019, .
Amazing Optical Illusions, Carlton, UK, 2018, .
Optical Illusions, QED Publishing, UK, 2017, .
You Can't Possibly Color This!, Moondance Press, USA, 2017, .
How to draw incredible optical illusions, Imagine Publishing, USA, 2015, .
Xtreme Illusions 2, National Geographic Kids, USA, 2015,  
Super Optical Illusions, Carlton Kids, UK, 2014,  
Hidden Picture Puzzles, Imagine Publishing, USA, 2014,  
Optical Illusions: An Eye-Popping Extravaganza of Visual Tricks, Dover Publications, USA, 2014,  
Impossible Colouring Book: Can You Colour These Amazing Visual Illusions?, Arcturus Publishing, UK, 2014,  
Make Your Own 3D Illusions - 3D illusions pack: All You Need to Build 50 Great Illusions, Carlton Books, UK, 2014,  
Impossible Folding Puzzles and Other Mathematical Paradoxes, Dover Publications, USA, 2014,

Non-fiction books in other languages 
Les millors il·lusions òptiques, Editorial Brúixola, Spain, 2020, 
Las mejores ilusiones ópticas, Editorial Bruño, Spain, 2020, 
Optične iluzije, Tehniška Založba Slovenije D.d., Slovenia, 2019, 
Ilusões Óticas, Booksmile, Portugal, 2019, 
Varázslatos optikai csalódások, Ventus Libro Kiadó, Hungary, 2019, 
Optische illusies, Lantaarn Publishers, Netherlands, 2019, 
Ilusões de ótica, Quarto (Nobel), Brazil, 2018, 
Optische Illusionen, Ars Edition, Germany, 2018, 
Illusions d’optique, Fleurus, France, 2018, 
錯視の魔術, Kyouikugageki, Japan, 2018, 
Optiska illusioner , Ordalaget, Sweden, 2018, 
Illusioni ottiche, Armenia, Italy, 2018, 
Vertigo: 50 Schwindelerregende Optische Illusionen, Moses Verlag, Germany, 2016,  
Optische Täuschungen XXL, Ars Edition, Germany, 2016, 
謎解き錯視 傑作135選 (135 Mysterious Optic Artworks to Solve), Sogen-Sha, Japan, 2015, 
Libro para colorear figuras imposibles, Editorial HISPANO EUROPEA, Spain, 2014,  
3D Optiset Harhat, Readme.fi, Finland, 2014,  
Incroyables Illusions d’Optique, Ça m’intéresse, France, 2014,  
50 Illusions d’Optique 3D, Editions Ça m’intéresse, France, 2014,  
Illusions - Coloriage Créatif, Editions Bravo, Canada, 2014, 
图中奥秘 : 挑战脑力的错视图 (Amazing Visual Illusions), Qingdao Shi, China, 2013, 
图有玄机 : 挑战眼力的错视图 (The World of Visual Illusions), Qingdao Shi, China, 2013,  
Le Cabinet des Illusions d’Optique : 100 Illusions Stupéfiantes, Editions Fleurus, France, 2013,  
Удивительные оптические иллюзии (Amazing Visual Illusions), Art-Rodnik, Russian Federation, 2013,  
Рисуем оптические иллюзии (Drawing Optical Illusions), Art-Rodnik, Russian Federation, 2013,  
Kiehtovat Optiset Harhat, Kustannusosakeyhtiö Nemo, Finland, 2013,  
Optische Illusionen, Ars Edition, Germany, 2013,  
Pliages, découpages et magie, Editions Pole, France, 2012,  
De wonderlijke wereld van de optische illusies, Deltas Centrale uitgeverij, The Netherlands, 2012,  
Unglaubliche Optische Illusionen, Verlag an der Este, Germany, 2012, Artikel-Nr.: 019435 
Spectaculaire Optische Illusies, Uitgeverij Atrium, The Netherlands, 2011,  
L’étrange univers des illusions d’optique, Editions Fleurus, France, 2011,  
Ilusiones Opticas, Circulo de Lectores Barcelona, Spain, 2010,  
Fantasticas ilusiones opticas, Editorial Libsa Sa, Spain, 2010,  
Optische Täuschungen, Bassermann F., Germany, 2009,  
Fantastische Optische Illusionen, Tosa Verlagsgesellschaft, Germany, 2008, 
FantaLogica, Edizioni La Meridiana, Italy, 2009, 
Neue Optische Illusionen, Weltbild, Germany, 2008, 
阿基米德视幻觉游戏 (Archimedes' Visual Illusion Games), China Friendship Publishing Company, China, 2007,  
视幻觉 (Optical illusions), China Friendship Publishing Company, China, 2007,  
Optische Illusionen, Weltbild, Germany, 2006,  
Niewe Optische Illusies, BZZTOH, The Netherlands, 2006,  
Nouvelles Illusions d’Optique, France Loisirs, France, 2006, 
MateMagica, Edizioni La Meridiana, Italy, 2005, 
L’Almanach du Mathématicien en herbe, Editions Archimède, France, 2002,  
La Couleur dans tous ses états, Editions Yva Peyret, France, 1995,

Personal life 
Sarcone has practiced and continues to practice various Martial arts and Combat sports, including Yoseikan budō, Kickboxing, Jujutsu), and holds a black belt in Taekwondo.

References

Related links 
 Neuroscience
 Op art
 Optical illusion
 Visual thinking
 Thinking outside the box
 Recreational mathematics
 Best Illusion of the Year Contest

External links 

 
 These Patterns Move But It’s All An Illusion by G. Sarcone
 The Optical Illusion That Makes Static Lines Look Like They're Pulsing
 G. Sarcone's autokinetic illusions on Scene 360
 Archimedes-lab.org
 Rivista Magia
 2011 Best Visual Illusions of the Year
 2014 Best Visual Illusions of the Year
 'Mask of Love' illusion by G. Sarcone
 G. Sarcone’s biography and bibliography on Amazon
 Sarcone’s works on Artstack gallery
 Sarcone’s autokinetic pictures on Saatchi online

English science writers
Italian science writers
Living people
Italian artists
1962 births